"Mulga Bill's Bicycle" is a poem written in 1896 by Banjo Paterson. It was originally published on the 25th of July 1896 edition of the Sydney Mail, and later appeared in the poet's second poetry collection Rio Grande's Last Race and Other Verses.

The poem is a ballad. Each line is a fourteener, having fourteen syllables and seven iambic feet.

Synopsis
It tells the tragic tale of Mulga Bill, a man whose pride in his riding skill causes him to purchase, ride and crash a bicycle. Although Mulga Bill claims expertise in riding all things his ineptitude and subsequent accident suggest that he may only know how to ride a horse.

The poem was first published in The Sydney Mail on 25 July 1896 and was illustrated by Norman Hardy. It is amongst Paterson's most popular works.  A 1973 reprinting of the poem illustrated by Kilmeny & Deborah Niland has been continuously in print since publication and won the 1973 ABPA Book Design Award and the 1974 Visual Arts Board Award.

The novel by H. G. Wells on cycling, The Wheels of Chance: A Bicycling Idyll was published in the same year as this poem.

The poem actually featured the Safety bicycle.  However, the poem has been inaccurately illustrated by various illustrators with a depiction of the visually more interesting Penny-farthing which had been superseded at the time the poem was written. The introduction of safety cycles gave rise to a bicycling boom with millions being manufactured in the decade 1890–1900.  They were very popular in the Australian outback, widely used by shearers and itinerant workers at the time that Paterson wrote this poem.

The model for the character of Mulga Bill was William Henry Lewis (1880-1968), who knew Paterson in the vicinity of Bourke, New South Wales. Lewis had bought his bicycle as a result of a drought when there was no feed for horses.

Eaglehawk, Victoria—once a rural mining town, now part of greater Bendigo—was given as Mulga Bill's hometown (Twas Mulga Bill, from Eaglehawk ...). This has been recognised with the development of the Mulga Bill Bicycle Trail, a scenic ride taking in many of the mining attractions, historic sites and modern-day amenities of Eaglehawk.

Mulga is a very common species of Acacia that predominates the interior regions of the Australian bush, and colloquially, it is an alternative term for the Bush itself or wilderness regions,  for example ‘up the mulga’. This poem is extremely important to Australian culture because it includes the start of the cycling craze.  In the time this poem was written, everyone was buying bicycles because it was (and still partly is) popular in Australia.

The poem has been set to music and the poem title was the name of a prominent Australian folk music group (also known as a bush band) in the 1970s.

References 

Poetry by Banjo Paterson
1896 poems
Works originally published in Australian newspapers